Buscot Lock is a lock on the River Thames in England, near the village of Buscot, Oxfordshire.

The lock was built of stone by the Thames Navigation Commission in 1790 and is the smallest on the River Thames. Like most of the Upper Thames Locks, it still has its heavy wooden beams which the lock keeper uses to open and close the gates. 

The new weir was created in 1979 when a cut was made through fields on the southern side of the lock. Of an  unusual cresting design, it is now a National Trust picnic area. The weir was previously on the northern side of the lock. The area is rich in flora and fauna, and a frequent haunt for otters, kites and kingfishers.

History
Before the construction of the lock, a flash lock  was in place at Buscot weir to help navigation. When the lock was built the weir was owned by Edward Loveden Loveden of Buscot Park, who was a very strong champion of Thames navigation. The pound lock was built by J. Nock who also built St John's Lock at the same time after the opening of the Thames and Severn Canal. At first it was often alluded to as the "New Lock". The lock keeper's cottage was built in 1791 and features a fish house. The old weir was renewed by Lord Faringdon of Buscot Park in 1909, and was replaced by the new cut and weir in 1979.

Reach above the lock

The river winds and doubles back on itself sharply on the short stretch upstream. 

Buscot Park is above the lock. Robert Tertius Campbell who bought it in 1859 built a factory to distill alcohol from sugar beet. He supplied water to his estate from the river via a set of water wheels, but closed the undertaking in 1879. The property is now owned by the National Trust. Upstream, Bloomers Hole Footbridge crosses the river, then the River Cole enters from the southern bank, the River Leach enters from the northern bank, and finally St John's Bridge marks the beginning of St John's Lock.

The Thames Path follows the northern bank from Buscot Lock to Bloomers Hole Footbridge, where it crosses the river.

See also 
 Lechlade-on-Thames
 Locks on the River Thames
 Crossings of the River Thames

References

External links 
 Buscot Lock at riverthames.co.uk
 Picture of Buscot Lock at geograph.co.uk

Locks on the River Thames